A list of the most notable films produced in Bulgaria during the 2020s ordered by year of release. For an alphabetical list of articles on Bulgarian films, see :Category:Bulgarian films.

List

2020

2021

2022

References

External links 

 Complete list of all Bulgarian films
 The Internet movie database
 Feature Films Bulgaria at Cineuropa

2020s
Films
Bulgaria